James McKean may refer to:

 James B. McKean (1821–1879), American politician from New York and Utah
 James McKean (Australian politician) (1832–1901), solicitor and politician in colonial Victoria (Australia)
 Jim McKean (1945–2019), Canadian umpire in Major League Baseball
 Jim McKean (footballer) (1884–1936), Australian rules footballer